Piet Tsweu Mokoro (born 3 January 1982) is a South African former soccer player who played as a midfielder.

References

1982 births
South African soccer players
Living people
Soccer players from the Free State (province)
Association football midfielders
Free State Stars F.C. players
Moroka Swallows F.C. players
SuperSport United F.C. players
Cape Town Spurs F.C. players
AmaZulu F.C. players
African Warriors F.C. players
South African Premier Division players
National First Division players